Two River Theater is a professional, not-for-profit, regional theater company producing plays and educational programs for audiences from central New Jersey and beyond. It is located in Red Bank, New Jersey, on the peninsula between the Navesink and Shrewsbury Rivers that gave the theater its name. Two River Theater produces a multi-play subscription season.

The company received "Theatre of the Year" awards from the New Jersey Theatre Alliance in 2006, and from The Star-Ledger in both 2006 and 2008. At the July 2009 meeting of the New Jersey State Council on the Arts, Two River Theater was designated as a Major Impact Organization. Two River Theater is a member of LORT (League of Resident Theatres), Theatre Communications Group and the New Jersey Theatre Alliance.

History
Two River Theater was founded by Joan and Robert Rechnitz in 1994. The companies first three seasons occurred at  Monmouth University.  Then it moved to Manasquan and finally built a theater for itself in Red Bank in 2005.

Currently under the leadership of Artistic Director John Dias and Managing Director Michael Hurst, Two River Theater develops and produces great American theater created by today's most gifted, adventurous artists. Each year, more than 55,000 patrons and guests come through the doors to see productions in two intimate performance spaces, the Joan and Robert Rechnitz Theater and the Marion Huber Theater.

Programing 
Crossing Borders is an annual five-day festival of new plays by Latino writers and free community events. It was begun in 2011.  Nosotros is a program that fosters a closer relationship between theater and Latino artists and audiences.  Another annual programs is a Cabaret of New Songs for the Musical Theater.

Two River Theater's new-play commissioning program, launched in 2010, commissions two plays a year and has produced more than five of these works. Each season, the theater hosts numerous artist residencies, workshops, and readings to support the development of new work for the American theater, including separate week-long retreats with Clubbed Thumb and NYU's Graduate Musical Theater Writing program.

In 2020 Two River began a partnership with National Asian American Theater to foster the inclusion of more Asian American Artists in theater across the country.

Education programs

Two River offers theater arts programs to students from 1st through 12th grade. Student matinees serve students in 50 schools throughout New Jersey. Classroom residencies support academic achievement and allow students to engage with theater artists. Multiple programs also introduce at-risk adolescents to theater.

"A Little Shakespeare" series, launched during Two River's 20th Anniversary Season, is an educational program that produces an annual production of a Shakespeare play performed by high-school students.

The Metro Scholar program offers high school juniors the opportunity to explore professional theater and play a role in the life of Two River Theater.

PlayBack is a program in which selected high school students work with Two River Teaching Artists who guide them in the creation and performance of their own original play inspired by, in response to, and in conversation with a production on the theater's main stage.

Summer Ensembles is a three-week summer program offered to students from first to twelfth grade. Teaching artists channel students’ natural energy and vitality into creative thinking, teamwork, and performance skills through theater games, songs and devising original material. Students get the opportunity to perform for their peers, and to see the inner-workings backstage with the Two River production staff.

Theater Complex 

The Two River Theater's roof is designed to evoke the waves of a river. The building was designed by New York architect Stewart Jones, of Hardy, Holzman, Pfeiffer & Associates, who also designed the Wilma Theater in Philadelphia and the Harvey Theater at the Brooklyn Academy of Music.

The main Rechnitz Theater is a thrust stage that seats 350 patrons. The Marion Huber Theater is a fully convertible, 99-seat black box space that hosts more experimental works, readings, classes, and rehearsals, and provides an intimate experience for audience members. The buildings also contain an on site costume shop and set shop where the sets are made.

A new three story building next to the theater has increased Two Rivers rehearsal space, costume and set shop spaces and room for public programing.

Production history

Previous seasons

2016/2017
Ma Rainey’s Black Bottom, The Lion In Winter, A Very Electric Christmas, Hurricane Diane, The Merry Wives of Windsor, The Women of Padilla, and The Ballad of Little Jo

2015/2016
Seven Guitars, A Funny Thing Happened on the Way to the Forum, A Little Shakespeare: Pericles, Lives of Reason, Ropes, Pericles, I Remember Mama, Where the Wild Things Are

2014/2015
The School for Wives, Camelot, The Very Hungry Caterpillar, Absurd Person Singular, Guadalupe in the Guest Room, Your Blues Ain't Sweet Like Mine, A Little Shakespeare: A Midsummer Night's Dream, Be More Chill

2013/2014
On Borrowed Time, A Map of the Soul: The Tricky Part and All The Rage, A Wind in the Willows Christmas, As You Like It, A Little Shakespeare: As You Like It, Pinkolandia, Meredith Willson's 'The Music Man' - In Concert, Trouble In Mind, Third

2012/2013
Topdog/Underdog, No Place To Go, Henry V, A Wind in the Willows Christmas, Two Trains Running, The Electric Baby, 2.5 Minute Ride, Present Laughter

2011/2012
Much Ado About Nothing, Seven Homeless Mammoths Wander New England, No Child..., HONK!, Jitney, In This House, Carry It On, My Wonderful Day

2010/2011
Intimate Apparel, Opus, Charlotte's Web, A Thousand Clowns, Candida, Jacques Brel is Alive and Well and Living in Paris, Namaste Man, It Goes Without Saying 

2009/2010
26 Miles, A Midsummer Night’s Dream, You're a Good Man Charlie Brown, Barefoot in the Park, Orestes, Picasso at the Lapin Agile

2008/2009
Too Much Light Makes the Baby Go Blind, Garden of Earthly Delights, Art, Heartbreak House, A Year with Frog and Toad, ReEntry, Mary’s Wedding, Melissa Arctic, Private Lives

2007/2008
Bad Dates, Our Town, The Charlatan’s Séance, Mere Mortals, The Ghost’s Bargain, Macbeth, The Glass Menagerie, A Murder A Mystery & A Marriage

2006/2007
Accomplice, Ain’t Misbehavin’, Tartuffe, The Pavilion, True West, The Underpants

2005/2006
The Umbrellas of Cherbourg, Visiting Mr. Green, All My Sons, Waiting for Godot, What The Butler Saw

2004/2005
Accidental Death of an Anarchist, The Beauty Queen of Leenane, The Syringa Tree, You Can’t Take It With You

2003/2004
The Tragedy of Carmen, Abigail’s Party, Miss Julie, A Life in the Theater

2002/2003
Old Wicked Songs, Spunk, Salome, Stinkin’ Rich

2001/2002
A Delicate Balance, Cookin’ at the Cookery, Peer Gynt, The House of Blue Leaves

2000/2001
Arms and the Man, La Bệte, American Buffalo, The Heiress

1999/2000
Blood Wedding, Uncle Vanya, The Fantasticks, Light Up the Sky

1998/1999
The Real Thing, Thieves’ Carnival, Hedda Gabler, Noises Off

1997/1998
The Dining Room, The Glass Menagerie, Machinal, The Importance of Being Earnest

1996/1997
A View from the Bridge, Reckless, Betrayal, Blithe Spirit

1995/1996
Nora, The Illusion, The Curse of the Starving Class, All in the Timing

1994/1995
The Cocktail Hour, The Heidi Chronicles, Misalliance

World premieres
ReEntry (January 2009), Orestes (March 2010), Seven Homeless Mammoths Wander New England (October 2011),  In This House (March 2012),  A Wind in the Willows Christmas (December 2012), Guadalupe in the Guest Room (February 2015), Your Blues Ain't Sweet Like Mine (April 2015), Be More Chill (May 2015), Lives of Reason (January 2016), Hurricane Diane (January 2017), The Women of Padilla (April 2017).

Co-productions 
Macbeth (Folger Theatre), 26 Miles (Round House Theatre), A Midsummer Night’s Dream (California Shakespeare Theater), Orestes (Folger Theatre), Meredith Willson's The Music Man - In Concert (New Jersey Performing Arts Center)

Special guests 
The theater opened in April 2005 with a live taping of VH1 Storytellers featuring Bruce Springsteen. Bon Jovi performed a two-hour set at the theater in 2005. Jackson Browne (joined by special guest Bruce Springsteen), performed a benefit concert at the theater in summer 2007.

Two River Theater has hosted a number of luminaries and award winners including Olympia Dukakis and Edward Albee. Two River has welcomed comedian Stephen Colbert and Academy Award winner, Philip Seymour Hoffman. Notable guests have also included Alec Baldwin, Kevin Kline, Suzan-Lori Parks, David Hyde Pierce, Seth Rudetsky, and Joel Grey.

Transfers 
In January 2009, Two River Theater produced the world premiere of associate artistic director KJ Sanchez's ReEntry, co-written by Emily Ackerman, which followed with a month-long run at New York's Urban Stages. In May 2010 ReEntry was performed at the Navy-Marine Combat Operational Stress Control Conference in San Diego for Navy and Marine Corps line leaders, combat veterans, caregivers, and their families.

In September 2008, Two River mounted Martha Clarke's performance piece The Garden of Earthly Delights, which then played at New York's Minetta Lane Theatre.

In 2015 Be More Chill had its world premiere at Two River; in 2019 it transferred to Broadway and in 2020 it went onto London's West End.

References

External links
 Official website
 Art Times article on theater

Theatre companies in New Jersey
Red Bank, New Jersey
Theatres in New Jersey
Buildings and structures in Monmouth County, New Jersey
Tourist attractions in Monmouth County, New Jersey